Cagnes-sur-Mer (literally Cagnes on Sea) is a French Riviera town in the Alpes-Maritimes department in the Provence-Alpes-Côte d'Azur region in southeastern France.

Geography
Cagnes-sur-Mer is a town in south-eastern France located on the shores of the Mediterranean Sea, between Saint-Laurent-du-Var and Villeneuve-Loubet.

History
It was the retreat and final address of the painter Pierre-Auguste Renoir, who moved there in 1907 in an attempt to improve his arthritis, and remained until his death in 1919. In the late 1920s, Cagnes-sur-Mer became a residence for many American renowned literary and art figures, such as Kay Boyle, George Antheil and Harry and Caresse Crosby. Author Georges Simenon (1903–1989), creator of the fictional detective Commissaire Jules Maigret, lived at 98, montée de la Bourgade in the 1950s with his third wife and their three children; his initial "S" may still be seen in the wrought iron on the stairs. Parisian artist, poet, and philosopher Georges Charaire had a home In Cagnes for many years. Creating his lithographs in the former studio of Paul Gauguin, and also as a co-founder of the Theatre du Tertre in Montmartre, he had a great influence on French art and thought in the 20th century. He helped his friend Eugène Ionesco with his first plays at the Theatre du Tertre. Charaire kept his second home in Cagnes sur Mer until his death in 2001.

Belarusian-French artist Chaïm Soutine created powerful, fanciful landscapes of southern France. A friend of Amedeo Modigliani, Soutine left colourful landscapes from Cagnes from 1924 on. Fauvist painter Francisco Iturrino also resided in the town where he died. The town may have been an inspiration for Neo-impressionist Henri-Edmond Cross (1856–1910), the artist who painted Cypresses at Cagnes (1908).

Population

Sights
Places of interest include Renoir's estate, Les Collettes, surrounded by olive trees; the Medieval castle at le Haut-de-Cagnes and the Cros quarter, founded by Italian fishermen in the nineteenth century.

It is also known for its horse racing venue, the Hippodrome de la Côte d'Azur, and a four-kilometre (2 mile) beach.

Transport
The Gare de Cagnes-sur-Mer railway station offers local services in the directions of Nice and Cannes.

International relations
The commune is twinned with:
  Passau (Germany, 1973)

Photo gallery

See also
 Communes of the Alpes-Maritimes department

References

External links

 Official website
 Official tourism website
 The Weather in Cagnes Sur Mer 

Cagnessurmer
Alpes-Maritimes communes articles needing translation from French Wikipedia